Andreas Pilavakis (born 10 July 1960) is a retired Cypriot taekwondo athlete. He won a bronze medal in the men's welterweight class at the 1993 World Taekwondo Championships held in New York City. Pilavakis was the first taekwondo athlete from Cyprus to win a world championship medal.

Notes

References
 Profile from Taekwondo Data

1960 births
Living people
Cypriot male taekwondo practitioners
World Taekwondo Championships medalists